Waldmünchen (Central Bavarian: Woidminga), is a town in the district of Cham, in Bavaria, Germany.

Origin

The years 910 or 928 are assumed to be the foundation date.

Mayors
 1946: Johann Pregler
 1948: Albert Pregler
 1956: Johann Kussinger
 1964: Max Eisenhart
 1978: Heinrich Eiber
 1984: Dieter Aumüller 
 2002: Franz Löffler 
 2010: Markus Ackermann,  reelected in 2014

International relations

Waldmünchen, Germany is twinned with:
Combourg,  France (since 1993)
Klenčí pod Čerchovem,  Czech Republic (since 1990)
Marktoberdorf,  Bavaria, Germany (since 1983)
Elz,  Hessen, Germany (since 2006)
Plain, Wisconsin (since 2022)

Live pictures

marketsquare ,
panoramic ,
from the tower

References

Cham (district)